In 2005, the United States Mint released a silver dollar commemorative coin in honor of the 230th birthday of the United States Marine Corps.

The coin was sold as both as a proof coin and an uncirculated coin, for a total number of 600,000 coins. They became available to order on July 20, 2005, and by September 21, 2005, all coins had been purchased.

This was the first time the United States released a coin to represent a branch of its military.

Specifications 
The coin features one of the most recognizable scenes of Marine Corps history, Raising the Flag on Iwo Jima. Additionally, the Marine Corps official emblem, the Eagle, Globe, and Anchor is on the reverse.

Mintage (max.): 600,000
Based on independent market research provided by the recipient organization (the Marine Corps Heritage Foundation), the Secretary exercised his authority (for the first time) to increase the legislated maximum mintage (500,000) to 600,000.

U.S. Mint Facility: Philadelphia

Public Law: 108-291

External links 
Original press release
Notification that all coins have been sold
Specifications of the minting

Currencies introduced in 2005
Modern United States commemorative coins
United States Marine Corps lore and symbols
United States silver coins
Eagles on coins
Maps on coins
Flags on coins
Works about the United States Marine Corps